Count Pol Boël (11 May 1923 – 19 July 2007) was a Belgian industrialist and liberal politician. He was a son of René Boël (1899–1990) and Yvonne Solvay (1896–1930). Pol Boël was married with Nicole Davignon, a sister of Étienne Davignon and together they have two children, Yvonne and Nicolas.

Sources
 Belgian Senate, Biografisch Handboek, Brussel, 1987, p. 53-54.
 Ysebaert, Clair, Politicowie. Politiek Zakboekje 1992, Zaventem, Kluwer Editorial, p. 17-18.

1923 births
2007 deaths
Politicians from Brussels
20th-century Belgian businesspeople

20th-century Belgian politicians
Walloon people